The 2011 North Queensland Cowboys season was the 17th season in the club's history. They competed in the National Rugby League's 2011 Telstra Premiership. They finished the regular season in 7th place and were knocked out in the first week of the finals by the eventual premiers, the Manly-Warringah Sea Eagles.

Season summary
After missing the finals the previous three seasons, finishing 15th in both 2008 and 2010, the Cowboys underwent a major overhaul of personnel for the 2011 season. Club legend Ty Williams retired and they parted ways with club favourites Luke O'Donnell, Carl Webb and Steve Southern. Their biggest signing for the 2011 season was Queensland and Australian representative centre Brent Tate. They also made key recruits in the signings of former Melbourne Storm and Queensland State of Origin representative Dallas Johnson, premiership winner Glenn Hall from the English Super League, re-signing a former Cowboy in Gavin Cooper and picking up younger, experienced first graders such as Antonio Winterstein.

The Cowboys' new signings had a positive impact on the NRL team, with the club spending the majority of the year in the top four before a late slide dropped them to seventh position and giving them their first finals appearance since 2007. In 2011, they were the most watched NRL club on pay television, and their Round 4 clash against the Parramatta Eels was the fourth most watched sports event in Fox Sport's history.

In the qualifying final, they led Manly 8–0 at half time before being overrun by the Sea Eagles who went on to claim the premiership.

Milestones
 Round 1: Glenn Hall, Ben Jones, Dallas Johnson and Ashton Sims made their debuts for the club.
 Round 2: Ashley Graham played his 100th game for the club.
 Round 2: Tariq Sims made his NRL debut.
 Round 3: Kalifa Faifai Loa made his debut for the club.
 Round 3: James Segeyaro made his NRL debut.
 Round 5: Antonio Winterstein made his debut for the club.
 Round 4: Matthew Bowen became the club's most capped player with 204 games.
 Round 9: Johnathan Thurston became the club's highest point scorer.
 Round 10: Willie Tonga played his 50th game for the club.
 Round 13: Johnathan Thurston scored his 50th try for the club.
 Round 14: Ashley Graham scored his 50th try for the club.
 Round 14: Joel Riethmuller made his NRL debut.
 Round 18: Cory Paterson made his debut for the club.
 Round 19: Brent Tate made his debut for the club.
 Round 23: James Tamou played his 50th game for the club.

Squad List

Squad Movement

2011 Gains

2011 Losses

Ladder

Fixtures

Pre-season

Regular season

Finals

Statistics

Source:

Representatives
The following players have played a representative match in 2011

Honours

League
Golden Boot: Johnathan Thurston
Dally M Prop of the Year: Matthew Scott
RLIF Prop of the Year: Matthew Scott
RLPA NYC Player of the Year: Jason Taumalolo
NYC Team of the Year: Kyle Feldt, Jason Taumalolo

Club
Paul Bowman Medal: Ashley Graham
Player's Player: Johnathan Thurston
Club Person of the Year: Gavin Cooper
Rookie of the Year: Tariq Sims
Most Improved: Ray Thompson
NYC Player of the Year: Jason Taumalolo

Feeder Clubs

National Youth Competition
 North Queensland Cowboys - 2nd, Runners-up

Queensland Cup
 Mackay Cutters - 11th, missed finals
 Northern Pride - 2nd, Lost Semi Final

References

North Queensland Cowboys seasons
North Queensland Cowboys season